The Cuban Olympic Committee is the organization that represents Cuban athletes in the International Olympic Committee (IOC), the Pan American Games and the Central American and Caribbean Games. It was created in Havana in 1926; however, it was not formally recognized by the IOC until 1955. The organization is currently directed by  José Fernández Álvarez.

The Cuban Olympic Committee is headquartered in Havana, Cuba.

See also 

 Cuba at the Olympics

References

External links
 www.olympic.org/cuba

National Olympic Committees
Cuba at the Olympics
Sports governing bodies in Cuba
1926 establishments in Cuba
Sports organizations established in 1926
Organizations based in Havana